Nigra may refer to:

Geography
 Castelnuovo Nigra, a comune (municipality) in the Province of Turin in the Italian region Piedmont
 Porta Nigra, a large Roman city gate in Trier, Germany
 Rupes Nigra, a phantom island, was believed to be a 33-mile-wide magnetic island of black rock located at the Magnetic North Pole

Medicine
 Dermatosis papulosa nigra, a condition of many small, benign skin lesions on that face that closely simulate seborrheic keratoses, a condition generally presenting on dark-skinned individuals
 Linea nigra, a dark vertical line that appears on the abdomen during pregnancy
 Substantia nigra, a portion of the brain associated with dopamine production
 Tinea nigra, a superficial fungal infection that causes dark brown to black painless patches on the soles of the hands and feet

People
 Christina Nigra, an actress who performed in The Sword and the Sorcerer, Twilight Zone: The Movie, and Cloak & Dagger
 Costantino Nigra, an Italian diplomatist

Other uses
 Patriotic Nigras, a group of griefers in the virtual world Second Life
 A variant spelling of "Negro"

See also 
 Niger (disambiguation)